Tango in Harlem is an album by saxophonist Teddy Edwards recorded in 1995 and originally released on the French Verve/Gitanes label the following year.

Reception 

In his review for BBC Music Magazine, Chris Parker stated "In his most sympathetic recording situation for a while, and playing a judicious mix of standards and bluesy originals with a first class rhythm section, Teddy Edwards (who is 72 this month) has produced what is probably his finest album since Together Again!!!! and Teddy's Ready!, the latter also featuring Billy Higgins. Edwards’s sound is elegant, deceptively easygoing and intensely melodic but is laced with enough post-bop astringency to lift him firmly out of the easy-listening category. On ballads such as ‘The Nearness of You’ and ‘Old Folks’, their momentum miraculously sustained through murderously slow tempos by excellent rhythm-section work, he savours every lingering note. On up-tempo, bustling pieces, his solos, while supremely logical, are imbued with his trademark relaxed swing. ... Overall, a superb performance from a mature master".

Track listing 
All compositions by Teddy Edwards except where noted
 "Bésame Mucho" (Consuelo Velázquez) – 6:15
 "The Nearness of You" (Hoagy Carmichael, Ned Washington) – 7:27
 "Cruisin' and Groovin'" – 7:10
 "Two Steps Down" – 4:41
 "Old Folks" (Willard Robison. Dedette Lee Hill) – 6:12
 "Sunset Eyes" – 6:54
 "Ornithology" (Benny Harris, Charlie Parker) – 4:16
 "Tango in Harlem" – 5:16
 "Alfie" (Burt Bacharach, Hal David) – 4:05
 "Nica's Dream" (Horace Silver) – 7:28
 "Undecided" (Charlie Shavers, Sid Robin) – 4:29
 "Sponavating the Blues" – 5:28

Personnel 
Teddy Edwards – tenor saxophone
Christian McBride – bass
Billy Higgins – drums

References 

1995 albums
Teddy Edwards albums
Verve Records albums